The seventh season of the Romanian reality talent show Vocea României premiered on ProTV on September 8, 2017. Pavel Bartoș returned as host. Loredana Groza, Smiley and Tudor Chirilă returned as coaches, while Adrian Despot replaced Marius Moga as the fourth coach.

The season finale aired on December 15, 2017. Ana Munteanu, mentored by Smiley, was declared winner of the season. It was Smiley's second victory as a coach.

Auditions

The open call auditions were held in the following locations:

Teams
 Color key

Blind auditions
Color key

Episode 1 (September 8)
The first episode aired on September 8, 2017.

Episode 2 (September 10)
The second episode aired on September 10, 2017.

Episode 3 (September 15)
The third episode aired on September 15, 2017.

Episode 4 (September 22)
The fourth episode aired on September 22, 2017.

Episode 5 (September 29)
The fifth episode aired on September 29, 2017.

Episode 6 (October 6)
The sixth episode aired on October 6, 2017.

Episode 7 (October 13)
The seventh and the last blind auditions episode aired on October 13, 2017.

The Battles
After the Blind auditions, each coach had fourteen contestants for the Battle rounds. The Battles rounds started with episode 8 on October 20, 2017. Coaches began narrowing down the playing field by training the contestants. Each battle concluding with the respective coach eliminating one of the two contestants. Each coach could steal one losing contestant from another team, but the stolen artist can be replaced by another artist until the end of this round.

Color key:

Episode 8 (20 October)
The eighth episode aired on October 20, 2017.

Episode 9 (27 October)
The ninth episode aired on October 27, 2017.

Episode 10 (3 November)
The tenth episode aired on November 3, 2017.

Episode 11 (10 November)
The eleventh episode aired on November 10, 2017.

Live Shows
Color key:

Week 1 (November 17)
The first group of contestants from each team competed in the first live show, which aired on Friday, November 17, 2017. The public vote could save one contestant from each team, the second one being chosen by the coach. The other two contestants were eliminated.

Week 2 (November 24)
The second group of four contestants from each team competed in the second live show, which aired on Friday, November 24, 2017. Voting proceeded as before.

Week 3 (December 1)
All 16 remaining contestants competed in the third live show on December 1, 2017. Voting proceeded as before.

Week 4 (December 8) 
All eight remaining contestants performed two songs each in the semi-final on Friday, December 8, 2017: a solo song and a trio with the coach and the other teammate. The public vote could save one contestant from each team, the second one was eliminated.

Week 5 - Final (December 15) 
The top 4 contestants performed in the grand final on Friday, December 15, 2017. This week, the four finalists performed a solo song, a duet with a special guest and a duet with their coach. The public vote determined the winner, and that resulted in a victory for Ana Munteanu, Smiley's second victory as a coach.

Elimination chart 
Color key
Artist info

Result details

Overall

Ratings

References

2017 Romanian television seasons